Agaricus amicosus is a mushroom in the family Agaricaceae, found in high-elevation forests in the Rocky Mountains, and is particularly common in the Colorado Rockies. It occurs in deep leaf litter under spruce and fir and fruits from late summer to early fall. It is considered a choice edible species.

See also
 List of Agaricus species

References
 Kerrigan RW. (1989). Studies in Agaricus IV: New species from Colorado. Mycotaxon 34:119-128. (pp. 120, 121, 122, 123, 124)
 Kerrigan RW. (2016). Agaricus of North America. New York Botanical Garden.

External links

Agaricus amicosus at MyCoPortal
Agaricus amicosus at mushroomobserver.org
Agaricus amicosus at mushroomexpert.com

amicosus
Fungi of North America
Edible fungi
Fungi described in 1989